Ananuri Bridge (ananuris khidi) is a bridge over the Aragvi River in 45 miles west of Tbilisi, capital of Georgia. The bridge links the Georgian Military Road which goes through the scenic historical Ananuri Castle Complex consisting of two castles joined by a crenellated curtain wall. It is visible from the Ananuri Castle.

See also
 Bridge of Peace
 Baratashvili Bridge
 Architecture of Georgia

References

Road bridges
Tourism in Georgia (country)
Bridges in Georgia (country)
Road bridges in Europe